Burt GAA is a Gaelic Athletic Association club located in the paris of Burt, County Donegal, Ireland. The club fields teams in hurling, Gaelic football, camogie and Ladies' Gaelic football.

History

Located in the parish of Burt, on the main road between Letterkenny and Derry, Burt GAA Club is one of the oldest clubs in Donegal, having been founded in 1887. Evidence of Gaelic games activity in the area even pre-dates the establishment of the Gaelic Athletic Association.

Since winning their first Donegal SHC title in 1952, the club has come to dominate the championship. From 1991 to 2006, Burt won a record 16 titles in-a-row. The club won its 39th SHC title in 2018. Burt GAA Club has also enjoyed success on the Gaelic football field, winning a Donegal JFC title in 2011 and a Donegal IFC title in 2016.

Honours

Donegal Senior Hurling Championship (39): 1952, 1955, 1956, 1957, 1961, 1962, 1965, 1967, 1968, 1969, 1970, 1971, 1976, 1979, 1982, 1989, 1991, 1992, 1993, 1994, 1995, 1996, 1997, 1998, 1999, 2000, 2001, 2002, 2003, 2004, 2005, 2006, 2009, 2011, 2012, 2013, 2014, 2015, 2018
Donegal Intermediate Football Championship (1): 2016
Donegal Junior Football Championship (1): 2011

Notable players

 Ciarán Dowds: 20-time Donegal SHC-winner.
 Mickey McCann: 20-time Donegal SHC-winner.

References

Gaelic games clubs in County Donegal
Hurling clubs in County Donegal
Gaelic football clubs in County Donegal